Brian John Coppins (born 1949) is a botanist and lichenologist, considered a world authority on crustose lichens and a leading expert on the genus Micarea.

Education
Coppins' interest in lichens was sparked during a field trip to the Scottish island of Handa while studying at Tunbridge Wells Technical School for Boys. While still an undergraduate at the University of Hull, Coppins was the co-author, with D. W. Shimwell, of an important study of lichen dynamics in managed heathland. After receiving his B.Sc. in 1970, Coppins became a graduate student at King's College London and studied lichen ecophysiology under the supervision of Francis Rose but he changed the focus of his doctoral studies to the taxonomy of Micarea species found in Europe.

Career
In 1974 was appointed as an ascomycete taxonomist in the herbarium of the Royal Botanic Garden Edinburgh (RBGE). He spent his career there, retiring in May 2009. He received his Ph.D. in 1982 from University College London. His dissertation, supervised jointly by Francis Rose and Peter Wilfred James, was published in 1983. The work was based upon examination of about 3500 lichen collections and involved field work not only in the British Isles but also in Denmark and Sweden. His field research has been mostly in Scotland but he has also collected lichens in "Borneo, Chile, the Carpathians, Thailand, USA, Norway and Canada". He has contributed about 25,000 preserved specimens to the RBGE's herbarium. His co-collectors include Ursula Katherine Duncan, David John Galloway, Peter W. James, and Francis Rose. He also collaborated with in field studies on lichen distrubutions with Oliver Gilbert, Alan Fryday and Vince Giavarini.

Brian Coppins and his wife Alexandra "Sandy" M. Coppins have worked together for decades, making thousands of lichen surveys. They have also worked to increase awareness of the importance of lichen communities and to conserve "habitats such as the Atlantic hazel woods, Scottish native pinewoods, and alpine areas such as Ben Lawers and the Ben Nevis range". In 2009 they received The Plantlife Award for Contributions to the Conservation of Plant Diversity. In 2016 Brian and Sandy Coppins were jointly awarded the Lifetime Achievement Award of the Royal Society for the Protection of Birds (RSPB) Scotland and, in addition, the Bob Saville Award from the Wildlife Information Centre in Bo'ness.

Awards and honours
Brian Coppins was the president of the British Lichen Society from 1988 to 1989. He was Senior Editor of the RBGE's Edinburgh Journal of Botany from 1984 to 2001 and continues to serve on the editorial boards of The Lichenologist (since 1983) and the Turkish Journal of Botany (since 2001).

He was honoured in the naming of the fungal genus Coppinsia, and the genus Briancoppinsia.

Selected publications
  1980
  1998
 
  2006
  2007
  2007
  2007
 
  2010
  2011
  2014

See also
:Category:Taxa named by Brian John Coppins

References

1949 births
Living people
British lichenologists
20th-century British botanists
21st-century British botanists
Alumni of the University of Hull
Alumni of King's College London
Acharius Medal recipients
People from Pembury